Queens Park is a public park in the centre of the town of Swindon, England, east of the Regent Circus area.

The park has a Garden of Remembrance, officially opened by Princess Elizabeth on 15 November 1950, which commemorates those who died in World War II.

Queens Park is a suitable place for running and other recreational activities.

Parks and open spaces in Swindon